Jean-Paul Lecoq (born 13 October 1958) is a member of the National Assembly of France. He represents Seine-Maritime's 8th constituency and is a member of the French Communist Party. In the 2020 French municipal elections, Lecoq was the lead Communist candidate opposing Edouard Philippe's municipal election campaign in Le Havre.

References

1958 births
Living people
Politicians from Le Havre
Mayors of places in Normandy
French Communist Party politicians
Deputies of the 13th National Assembly of the French Fifth Republic
Deputies of the 15th National Assembly of the French Fifth Republic
Deputies of the 16th National Assembly of the French Fifth Republic